Valérie Mairesse (born 8 June 1954) is a French stage and film actress. She was nominated for the César Awards 1978 for Best Supporting Actress for her role in Repérages.

Theater

Filmography

External links

 

1955 births
French film actresses
Living people
French stage actresses
20th-century French actresses
21st-century French actresses
Actresses from Paris